A Pickle for the Knowing Ones is an 1802 autobiographical book written by American businessman Timothy Dexter. The book uses unorthodox spelling and grammar conventions, and contains almost no punctuation. Dexter was a rich businessman and eccentric, known for gaining his wealth through lucky investments like sending coals to Newcastle at the time of a miners' strike. The book includes complaints about things such as politicians and the clergy, while Dexter praises his own glory and even says that he should be the emperor of the United States. The second edition is noted for containing pages of punctuation in the appendix.

Background 
Dexter was born in Malden, Massachusetts, in 1743, and began working as a tanner at 16. He moved to Newburyport, Massachusetts, when he was 21 and married a wealthy widow, Elizabeth Frothingham, obtaining a sizable fortune with the marriage. At the end of the Revolutionary War, Dexter purchased a large sum of Continental currency that was worthless at the time. Several years later it had regained its value from prior to the war, making Dexter extremely wealthy. With it, he purchased ships and began a trading company.

Dexter began selling bed warmers to the West Indies, a move that proved to be a good idea when the captain sold them as ladles in molasses production. In another instance, Dexter bought a large amount of coal and sent it to Newcastle, an idea given to him by opponents as a trick, but it happened that Dexter sent the coal during a miners' strike in the town. Dexter's luck in the trading business soon made him one of the richest men in Massachusetts, causing much contempt from other businessmen in the area. Dexter had published letters in a number of newspapers that, in the words of Dexter, "amused the public with the comical ebullitions of Lord Dexter's genius." Dexter wrote A Pickle for the Knowing Ones and distributed it to the public free.

Content and themes 

The first edition of A Pickle for the Knowing Ones is 8,847 words long, totaling 32 pages. The book contains no punctuation, many misspellings and grammar mistakes, and randomly capitalized letters. An example of this can be found in the start of the fourth edition:To mankind at Large the time is Com at Last the grat day of Regoising what is that why I will tell you thous three kings is Rased Rased you meane should know Rased on the first Royal Arch in the world...

The text is structured like a series of letters; each section is signed "Timothy Dexter" at the bottom, with some containing headings like "From the museum of Timothy Dexter, esq." Throughout, Dexter complains about things like politicians and the clergy, while also praising his own glory and power. He even suggests that what the United States needed was an emperor, and that they should "... Call for me to take the helm ...".

After receiving complaints about the lack of punctuation, Dexter published a second edition in 1805, this time containing pages full of punctuation in the appendix. He tells the readers to "peper and solt it as they plese." Six more editions were published after Dexter died in 1806, containing letters and speeches by Dexter added by editors.

Legacy 
19th-century poet Oliver Wendell Holmes Sr. wrote in The Atlantic in 1890, "I am afraid that Mr. Emerson and Mr. Whitman must yield the claim of declaring American literary independence to Lord Timothy Dexter, who not only taught his countrymen that they need not go to the Heralds' College to authenticate their titles of nobility, but also that they were at perfect liberty to spell just as they liked, and to write without troubling themselves about stops of any kind."

The book was also covered by The New York Times in 1925. The author drew a comparison to Benjamin Franklin's Poor Richard's Almanack and detailed its usefulness in teaching typing, writing "for the student cannot allow his eyes to stray from the text to the keys and make a successful copy." Additionally, Dexter and A Pickle for the Knowing Ones were written on by author W. H. Blumenthal in 1932.

Notes and references

Notes

References

Sources

External links

  
 

1802 non-fiction books
American autobiographies